The Brunswick Baptist Church is a Baptist church in Brunswick, Melbourne, Australia. It is affiliated with the [[[Australian Baptist Ministries]].

History
The congregation was started in 1859 by Geo Burton and John Wallis, who were parishioners of the former Sydney Road Methodist Church (whose building now houses the Sydney Road Community School). As a result, the Baptist Church has been present on this site since 1862. However, the church building was only built in 1889. Indeed, the foundation stone was laid on May 30, 1889.

The organ was built by Gray and Davison, and it was originally meant for St Pancras Old Church in central London. It was installed in this church in 1929 by Frederick Taylor, when it was donated to the church by Frederick William Biggs.

The current pastor is Mark Payne.

Heritage significance
The church building was designed in the Gothic Revival architectural style, polychrome masonry.

It has been listed by Heritage Victoria with a "Heritage Overlay," which aims to protect places of local significance to Victoria.

References

Baptist churches in Melbourne
Churches completed in 1889
Gothic Revival architecture in Melbourne
19th-century Baptist churches
Gothic Revival church buildings in Australia
Buildings and structures in the City of Merri-bek
1889 establishments in Australia